Tommy Reamon (born March 12, 1952) is a retired African-American professional football player, who has worked as an actor, and is currently an educator in the Hampton Roads region of Virginia. As a high school football coach, Reamon has had some notable success in developing talent to become collegiate and professional football players among his students.

Collegiate, professional football
Reamon came out of the George Washington Carver High School, Newport News, Virginia. In 1971-72 as a Running Back, he would be named a two time National Junior College All American and Offensive player of the year at Fort Scott Junior College, Kansas, He would lead the NJCAA in rushing yards and touchdowns as well as leading Fort Scott to consecutive NJCAA National Championship games, winning the first and losing the second. He would later be inducted to the NJCAA Hall of Fame (1998).  He went on to be a running back at the University of Missouri. He was drafted in 1974 by the Pittsburgh Steelers of the NFL, and by the Florida Blazers in the World Football League's College Draft. Reamon was selected in round 29 by the Blazers. Reamon went on to stardom in the World Football League, and was named one of the league's MVPs in 1974 as a member of the Blazers. He help lead Florida to the first and only World Bowl game coming up short against the Birmingham Americans 22-21. A year later, he joined the Jacksonville Express of the WFL. After the WFL folded in 1975, Reamon joined the Pittsburgh Steelers. He scored a touchdown for the Steelers in the last game ever played between the NFL Super Bowl Champions and College All-Stars. During the 1976 pre-season the Steelers traded Reamon to the Kansas City Chiefs. Tommy Reamon holds the WFL records for most rushing yards in a game (189), Season (1576) and in the World Bowl (83). He gained a total of  750 yards from scrimmage and scored five touchdowns in 1976 for the Kansas City Chiefs. Reamon would go on to play for the Saskatchewan Roughriders in the CFL in 1977 after a failed try out for the Chicago Bears who were coached by former Blazers Head Coach Jack Pardee. While with the Bears during the 1977 pre-season, Reamon played in the NFC-AFC Hall of Fame game against the New York Jets. After the 1977 CFL season, he had a tryout for the Washington Redskins in 1978 and again played under his former WFL Florida Blazers Head Coach, Jack Pardee. Although Reamon was the leading rusher during the 1978 pre-season the Redskins cut Tommy Reamon.

Acting
Reamon went into acting after his football career ended, playing the role of Delma Huddle in the 1979 movie North Dallas Forty, and appeared in several episodes of the TV series Charlie's Angels between 1978 and 1982. He also appeared on episodes of Quincy and Fall Guy.

High school football coach
Reamon coached with the Newport News Public Schools for a number of years. He was at Ferguson High School until it was closed during a building modernization program in 1996. He then moved to Warwick High School.

From 2006 until early 2008, Tommy Reamon was employed coaching high school football at Gloucester High School in Gloucester County in the Virginia's Middle Peninsula region at the northern edge of Hampton Roads. 
At Gloucester High School, Coach Reamon's son Tommy Jr. was a national prospect at quarterback and considered a rising football star with collegiate potential, according to observers. Reamon Jr. had offers raining in from several Division 1 programs across the country but subsequently selected Old Dominion University in Norfolk where he headlined the first recruiting class in program history. He is now coaching on the collegiate level at Virginia Tech. Reamon Jr. also has other notable coaching stops the University of Virginia, Pittsburgh Steelers, and the University of Miami.

In April 2008, it was announced that Reamon had accepted a position with Virginia Beach City Public Schools as Head Football coach at Landstown High School in Virginia Beach. In 2017 The Landstown Eagles team 12-1, with a D6, Eastern Regional Playoff final.  Reamon has led the Landstown to VHSL playoffs seven of the past ten seasons.

Notable players under tutelage
In his tenure with Newport News Public Schools, Coach Reamon was noted for helping develop future NFL quarterbacks Aaron Brooks and Michael Vick. He also coached Marcus Vick, Michael's younger brother. Reamon assisted Brooks with his transition to the University of Virginia, and later, each of the Vick brothers at Virginia Tech, where they each received full scholarships.

After graduating from UVA. Brooks played for the Green Bay Packers; the New Orleans Saints, where he was the starting quarterback for six years; and the Oakland Raiders, during his last season in 2006. In 2008, he announced plans to invest in a redevelopment project in the economically depressed East End area of his hometown of Newport News. Earlier in 2008, he announced plans to invest in Southeast Commerce Center, a  redevelopment project his hometown of Newport News. The multimillion-dollar investment will be a mixed-use development with 190 town houses, a grocery store and retail offerings. Brooks commented to Newport News Daily Press: "It's a great opportunity to give back to the community...a lot of hard-working, middle-class people that live in the area. I'm just trying to make the area better for them."

References

External links
 
 

1952 births
Living people
American male film actors
American football running backs
Florida Blazers players
Jacksonville Express players
Kansas City Chiefs players
Missouri Tigers football players
High school football coaches in Virginia
Sportspeople from Newport News, Virginia
Players of American football from Virginia
African-American coaches of American football
African-American players of American football
21st-century African-American people
20th-century African-American sportspeople